The avian family Sylviidae was commonly called sylviid babblers or sylviid warblers. In July 2021, the International Ornithological Congress (IOC) recognized these 71 species. In July 2020, the IOC published a revision which moved more than half of the species to a new family, Paradoxornithidae, and transferred most of the remaining species to genus Curruca. The articles "Sylviidae" and "Parrotbill" contain the July 2021 lists.

This list is presented according to the July 2021 IOC taxonomic sequence and can also be sorted alphabetically by common name and binomial.

References

S